César Luis Menotti (born 5 November 1938), known as El Flaco ("Slim"), is an Argentine former football manager and player who won the 1978 FIFA World Cup as the head coach of the Argentina national team.

During his playing days, he played as a striker, most notably for Argentine clubs Rosario Central and Boca Juniors.

Playing career

After playing some games for the reserve team, Menotti debuted in Primera División playing for Rosario Central in 1960. His first professional match was on 3 July versus Boca Juniors, a 3–1 victory.

Menotti remained four seasons in Rosario Central prior to be transferred in 1964 to Racing, then moving to Boca Juniors in 1965, where he would win his first title as player, the 1965 Primera División. Two years later Menotti arrived to the North American Soccer League to play for the New York Generals. In 1968 Menotti was traded to Santos FC where he was teammate of Pelé and won the Campeonato Brasileiro Série A, Intercontinental Supercup and Campeonato Paulista all in 1968. After his tenure with Santos, Menotti signed with Clube Atlético Juventus, where he retired from football in 1970.

Early managerial career
After retiring from play, Menotti became friends with coach Miguel "Gitano" Juárez, with whom he traveled to the 1970 FIFA World Cup in Mexico. Fascinated by the Brazilian style of play led by his friend Pelé, he decided to become a coach himself. Menotti worked as coach assistant of Juárez in Newell's Old Boys.

As manager, Menotti won his first title with Huracán, the 1973 Torneo Metropolitano with a side that included notable players such as Carlos Babington, Miguel Brindisi, Roque Avallay and the outstanding René Houseman. That squad was widely praised by the media due to their style of playing, being considered one of the best Argentine teams of all time. Huracán played 32 matches, winning 19 with 5 loses. The squad scored 62 goals and received 30.

Argentina national team
Menotti was appointed the head coach of the Argentina national team in October 1974.

1978 World Cup
Menotti was the coach of Argentina when they won their first FIFA World Cup in 1978, defeating the Netherlands in the final.

Between 1978 and 1982
In 1979, Menotti led the Argentina U20 national team to success in the World Youth Championship in Japan, with Diego Maradona the team's star player.

1982 World Cup
At the 1982 World Cup, Argentina lost to Belgium in their opening match. The team started with Fillol; Olguin, Galván, Passarella, Tarantini; Ardiles, Gallego, Maradona; Bertoni, Díaz, and Kempes. Argentina then defeated Hungary and El Salvador, and met Italy and Brazil in Group 3 of the second round, although they lost both matches.

Later career
Menotti was appointed Barcelona head coach in 1983, helping them to win the Copa del Rey, 1983 Copa de la Liga and the 1983 Supercopa de España before leaving in 1984.

On 3 February 2017, Guadalajara made a formal offer to sign him on as their academy director.

In January 2019, Menotti was named as the director of the Argentina National Teams.

Personality, influence and political views
Menotti always displayed a rebellious streak and cultivated an image of coolness. He wore long hair, dressed casually, and used to drop references to cultural icons in his conversations, from writer Ernesto Sabato to singer Joan Manuel Serrat. He was opinionated on politics, projecting a left-wing socialist image that contrasted with his holding a very visible post during the right-wing military dictatorship.

Menotti famously proclaimed:

Honours

Player
Boca Juniors
Primera División: 1965 

Santos
Campeonato Brasileiro Série A: 1968
Intercontinental Supercup: 1968
Campeonato Paulista: 1968

Argentina
Copa América third-place: 1963

Manager
Huracán
Primera División: 1973 Metropolitano 

Barcelona
Copa del Rey: 1982–83
Copa de la Liga: 1983 
Supercopa de España: 1983

Argentina Youth
FIFA U-20 World Cup: 1979

Argentina
FIFA World Cup: 1978

Individual
World Soccer 22nd Greatest Manager of All Time: 2013

References

External links

Todo-Argentina biography 
Full Spanish language electronic text of "El DT del Proceso", a book strongly critical of Menotti's ethics and his links to the military regime 
 

1938 births
Living people
Footballers from Rosario, Santa Fe
Argentine footballers
Argentina international footballers
Rosario Central footballers
Boca Juniors footballers
Racing Club de Avellaneda footballers
Santos FC players
Clube Atlético Juventus players
Argentine Primera División players
Argentine expatriate footballers
Expatriate footballers in Brazil
Expatriate soccer players in the United States
National Professional Soccer League (1967) players
New York Generals players
New York Generals (NPSL) players
Argentine football managers
Argentina national football team managers
Argentina national under-20 football team managers
1978 FIFA World Cup managers
1982 FIFA World Cup managers
1975 Copa América managers
1979 Copa América managers
FIFA World Cup-winning managers
Mexico national football team managers
Newell's Old Boys managers
Club Atlético Huracán managers
Boca Juniors managers
Club Atlético River Plate managers
Club Atlético Independiente managers
Rosario Central managers
La Liga managers
FC Barcelona managers
Peñarol managers
Club Puebla managers
Tecos F.C. managers
Argentine expatriate football managers
Expatriate football managers in Italy
Expatriate football managers in Mexico
Expatriate football managers in Spain
Argentine socialists
Association football forwards
Argentine people of Italian descent
Argentine expatriate sportspeople in Brazil
Argentine expatriate sportspeople in the United States
Argentine expatriate sportspeople in Mexico
Argentine expatriate sportspeople in Spain
Argentine expatriate sportspeople in Italy